Nairobi fly is the common name for two species of rove beetle in the genus Paederus, native to East Africa. The beetles contain a corrosive substance known as pederin, which can cause chemical burns if it comes into contact with skin. Because of these burns, the Nairobi fly is sometimes referred to as a "dragon bug."

Description 
Adult beetles are predominantly black and red in colour, and measure 6–10 mm in length and 0.5–1.0 mm in width. Their head, lower abdomen, and elytra are black, with the thorax and upper abdomen red.

Biology
The beetles live in moist habitats and are often beneficial to agriculture because they will eat crop pests. Adults are attracted to incandescent and fluorescent lights, and as a result, inadvertently come into contact with humans.

Heavy rains, sometimes brought on by El Niño events, provide the conditions for the Nairobi fly to thrive. Outbreaks have occurred in 1998, 2007, 2019, 2020.

Relationship to humans

Paederus dermatitis
The beetles neither sting nor bite, but their haemolymph contains pederin, a potent toxin that causes blistering and Paederus dermatitis. The toxin is released when the beetle is crushed against the skin, often at night, when sleepers inadvertently brush the insect from their faces. People are advised to gently brush or blow the insect off their skin to prevent irritation.

References 

Paederinae
Beetles of Africa
Insect common names